Kitagata may refer to:
Kitagata, Gifu, a town located in Motosu District, Gifu Prefecture, Japan
Kitagata, Saga, a former town located in Kishima District, Saga Prefecture, Japan
Kitagata, Uganda, a town
Kitagata Hot Springs, in Uganda

See also
 Kitakata (disambiguation)